Congo Rapids (formerly Roaring Rapids) is a river rapids ride operating at Six Flags Great Adventure in Jackson, New Jersey, United States. The ride's name is inspired by the Congo River located in Africa.

History
Six Flags Astroworld and Intamin partnered in 1979 to build the world's first river rapids ride in 1980 called Thunder River. The popularity of Thunder River caused the start of the construction of another rapids ride, Roaring Rapids, at Six Flags Great Adventure in 1980. It was modeled after the kayak slalom course that was built in West Germany for the 1972 Summer Olympics. It was constructed in place of one of the park's first attractions, The Great Train Ride. After construction, it made its public debut at the park on June 16, 1981. After its debut, Roaring Rapids at Great Adventure received major modifications to get guests wetter with a safer ride experience. In 1991, Roaring Rapids received a new name, Congo Rapids, with the new theme area Adventure Rivers. Today, the river rapids is located in The Pine Barrens, along with Nitro, Jersey Devil Coaster and a kids area: Jr. Thrill Seekers. Congo Rapids operates from Memorial Day weekend through Labor Day weekend.

Ride
Once the twelve riders strap themselves into one of the twelve boats, the boat leaves the station to a canyon-themed, man-made river. During the ride, there are different objects in the water that disrupt the flow of the water creating rapids in the attraction. Also, the ride features waterfalls at the end of the course of the ride as another way to get riders completely soaked. Once riders go through the course of the ride, the boat will reach to one of the lifts to take the boats back to the station. Congo Rapids features dual loading stations, where boats can be loaded twice as fast than one loading station.

Incidents 

On July 15, 2012, a goose was trapped in the conveyor belt of the ride and would not fly away despite the attempts of the ride's staff; the staff decided to let the ride proceed, thus killing the goose. A goose endangerment protection organization requested that the U.S. Department of Agriculture (USDA) investigate the incident. A Six Flags spokeswoman defended the staff's decision to not endanger passengers' lives by saving the goose, as evacuating the passengers would have involved flushing the rafts into the ride's reservoir and having the riders exit the raft by a rope climb.

See also
 Roaring Rapids
 Thunder River

Primary sources

Great Adventure History, Roaring Rapids full of information and facts of Congo Rapids

References 

Water rides
Water rides manufactured by Intamin
Six Flags attractions
Six Flags Great Adventure
Amusement rides introduced in 1981
River rapids rides
1981 establishments in New Jersey